KaBlam! (stylized as KaBLaM!) is an American animated sketch comedy television series that ran on Nickelodeon from 1996 to 2000. The series was created by Robert Mittenthal, Will McRobb, and Chris Viscardi. The show was developed as a fully animated showcase for alternative forms of animation that were more common in indie films and commercials. Each episode thus features a collection of short films in different innovative styles of animation, bridged by the characters Henry and June, who introduce the short animations and have adventures of their own in between.

Although SNICK aired many Nicktoons not part of its block, KaBlam! was the only Nicktoon created for SNICK. The show was a critical and commercial success.
The show was last aired as a part of Nickelodeon's 'The Splat' programming block on October 8 and 9, 2016.

Production 
The segment creators include David Fain, Tim Hill, Steve Holman, Emily Hubley, Mark Marek, Mike Pearlstein, Mo Willems, and Cote Zellers. The theme song and all of the original background music on the show was provided by the Moon Ska Stompers, a band that consists of King Django, Victor Rice, and members of The Toasters and The New York Ska-Jazz Ensemble. The bulk of the soundtrack was 30-second instrumental clips of songs from The Toasters' album D.L.T.B.G.Y.D., while the theme song itself is a shortened version of the Toasters song "2-Tone Army". Tracks from the Associated Production Music library were also utilized.

KaBlam! was the first show to be spun off of All That. It was pitched to Nickelodeon in 1994 and aired two years later. The pilot episode, "Your Real Best Friend", was created in 1995 and finished in 1996. One of the shorts, Mo Willems's The Off-Beats was initially produced as standalone short films for Nickelodeon; but after it was nominated for a cable ACE award, more segments were produced for KaBlam!

The show began production in 1995 and premiered on October 11, 1996. The show ran for four seasons, totaling 48 episodes. The final episode was broadcast on January 22, 2000.

In 2010, Mark Marek, who created the Henry and June shorts, co-created the Warner Bros. Animation-produced cartoon, MAD. Julia McIlvaine, who voiced June, has appeared in a few episodes.

Episodes

Season 1
The first season began with regular cartoons in their regular order. Sniz & Fondue, Action League Now!, Prometheus and Bob, and Life with Loopy. The Off-Beats was also another regular cartoon that occasionally filled in for "Life with Loopy" or Prometheus and Bob. Other cartoons such as Surprising Shorts, Lava!, Angela Anaconda, and once, The Louie and Louie Show aired. This is the only season in which a Sniz & Fondue short is included in every episode. Henry and June frequently had random short plots when the screen was shown on them and barely had one main plot, unlike future episodes. They had one whole plot in Comics for Tomorrow Today and What the Astronauts Drink. The opening animation starts out with a hawk crashing into the camera while the camera pans through a forest, dives underwater and travels to Egypt where Egyptians dance and the Great Sphinx swipes at the camera. The camera then heads to outer space showing two kids in a ride, the planets, stars, asteroids, and flying saucers. After the United States Capitol is destroyed by two saucers, it then pans to a Godzilla-like monster destroying a city. It then pans to an open street comic book store and lands on the KaBlam! comic book, featuring the Flesh, Stinky Diver, Sniz, Fondue, and Loopy on it. The book is then opened by Henry and June. After they dance, the episode starts. At the start of the theme, a voiceover of a man shouts "Wake up the masses!". As soon as he finishes, another man (Bert Pence) continues by saying, "Assume the crash position. Hold on tight, take a deep breath for a new kind of cartoon show. It's KaBlam! Where cartoons and comics collide. Now to take you inside and turn the pages, here are your hosts, Henry and June." The ending theme for most of the first season is Toasters song Skaternity (performed by the 'Moon Ska Stompers').

Season 2
After seven more episodes of The Off-Beats, and one last episode of Surprising Shorts, they were officially taken out of KaBlam! One-time shorts were brought in such as Randall Flan's Incredible Big Top, The Girl with Her Head Coming Off, and The Adventures of Patchhead which did return in season 3. The Brothers Tiki appeared twice in season 2. Henry and June are now drawn differently and their voices are deeper. The opening theme to the show is barely changed. When the camera pans on the KaBlam! comic book, it is clearly seen that the cover is different. In place of the original characters, Thundergirl, Stinky Diver, Prometheus, Bob, Loopy, Sniz, and Fondue are seen. Also, Henry and June dance the macarena and then arm-in-arm, whereas in season one; it was just a bunch of random dances. The ending theme to the show is dramatically changed. Instead of Skaternity, it is "Everything You Said Has Been a Lie" by The Toasters (also performed by the 'Moon Ska Stompers'). After this season, the rating for KaBlam! went up from TV-Y to TV-Y7 for the remainder of the show's run.

Season 3
This season featured the last four episodes of Sniz & Fondue. JetCat and Race Rabbit are introduced and become minor shorts that appeared from time to time. The Adventures of Patchhead makes its second and final appearance. A music video for a song by James Kochalka called "Hockey Monkey" also appears once. Henry and June are drawn a little differently and their voices are slightly deeper. The opening theme is shortened and Henry and June have their own main plots now. In the episode "You May Already Be a...KaBlammer!", Lou Rawls is featured and voiced by the actual provider. The opening theme had a number of changes. After the camera comes up out of the water, it goes directly to the White House scene. After the Godzilla scene, the camera pans toward a school rather than the comic book stand. As it enters the classroom, the camera scares off a bird that was perched on a window. The camera pans by a teacher and through a number of students. It stops as it hits a student reading a KaBlam! comic book. On the cover of the comic book, it shows a child who is ecstatic. Henry and June then open the comic book, dance, and the episode starts. The announcer's line as he introduces the show is slightly changed. Instead of saying "Hold on tight, take a deep breath for a new kind of cartoon show", he says "Hold on tight, take a deep breath for a cartoon cramaganza!" The ending theme is not changed. This was also intended to be the final season until Nickelodeon renewed the show.

Season 4
All the shorts (except Action League Now! and Angela Anaconda, which both spun off into their own shows) come to an end in the final season. Life with Loopy and Prometheus and Bob air their last seven episodes while JetCat and Race Rabbit air their last one and three episodes, respectively. Music videos by They Might Be Giants appear twice; they were Why Does the Sun Shine? and Doctor Worm. One-time cartoons still appear: Fuzzball, Garbage Boy, Emmett Freedy, Stewy the Dog Boy, The Little Freaks, and The Shizzagee. One-time shorts are included in nearly every episode, excluding "A Nut in Every Bite!", "The KaBlair! Witch Project", and "Now With More Flava'". In every episode, Henry and June have their own main plot. In the episode "Sasquatch-ercise", Richard Simmons is featured and in the episode "Now With More Flava'", John Stamos and Busta Rhymes are featured; however, the stars did not voice their characters. The opening and ending themes are unchanged.

Shorts

Regular shorts 
Some of these shorts air more frequently and consistently than others.

Henry and June 

The animated hosts of KaBlam! who turn the pages of a comic book (changes with each episode) to reveal the next cartoon or alternative animation, as well as being involved in subplots of their own between the shorts. These shorts were directed by Mark Marek.

Characters 
 Henry is the energetic male co-host of KaBlam!. He tends to behave foolishly and believes that he looks good shirtless. He is best friends with June. However, they don't always see eye-to-eye, and June can seem more like a bully than a friend at times. He is more up-tight and practical than June (at times), and seems to be disaster-prone, especially around Mr. Foot, for reasons unknown. He once got sick of being the "butt monkey" and quit, opening his own restaurant. He later closed it and went back when he found June heartbroken. He's also been shown to be very girl-crazy, but with no girls returning the favor (except for June on many occasions). He takes his job as being the host of KaBlam! very seriously. One episode also revealed he had a crush on Thundergirl (of Action League Now!), but this is never mentioned again. In season 1, he's shown to be much smarter than June, almost being like an older brother to her (though they're the same age), but by season 2, it changed to the other way around. His feelings for June vary from him laughing when she gets hurt to being very sweet to her. He also has a tendency to get a bit emotional, actually about Action League Now!. His favorite comic book is Galaxy of Death, and action/horror comic series that June likes too, apparently. One thing he's known for is to freak out in a small situation (like what's going to happen in a short). Some of his special talents are playing the guitar and dancing. He's a bit taller than June. He can also get easily embarrassed, especially around girls. His voice seems to be the most recognizable that it changed over time, the other being Larry's of Life with Loopy. One distinctive feature that Henry has that June does not have is his freckles. Henry is voiced by Noah Segan.
 June is the show's more laid-back female co-host and is Henry's best friend. She has a sarcastic personality and enthusiasm for her job. In the first season, she is portrayed as a tomboyish ditz. By season 2, she has become much smarter but kept her tomboyishness. Her appearance slightly changed from the first season to the rest of the show, as in season 1, she's taller, and her ponytail is a bit spiky at the end (her ponytail also used to rise up or hang down depending on her mood in some of the very early episodes, however, this was dropped). Starting in season 2, her height decreased slightly and her ponytail became slightly curvy. Her bangs were also messier in season 1. She's also a bit clumsy (not as much as Henry, however). She's usually seen wearing her orange-red jacket (even if it is hot outside). She's usually seen wearing purple cleats. She also has a fiery temper and is prone to hurting others when angry including her friends. She also can be very bossy. She has a tendency to find Henry's dilemmas quite humorous, although on other occasions she is shown to care deeply for him. She rarely injured herself. She has also gone through the random switches from being a deadpan snarker to a sweet and caring young girl. She is also prone to anger as many people incorrectly call her a boy. In some of the very earlier episodes, she had a slight valley-girl dialect (this was dropped). One distinctive feature of June is her additional "baby fat". June is voiced by Julia McIlvaine.
 Mr. B. Foot is a giant Sasquatch who works on the show.  His hobbies include sleeping, injuring Henry, and unexpectedly stealing the spotlight. However, under the rage and bluster, he is not a terrible creature; he never injures June. In one episode, he is revealed to be an accomplished drummer. He once spoke in the episode, "A Little Dab'll Do Ya".
 Mr. Fred Stockdale is the elderly network executive in charge of KaBlam!. He acts rather senile, and will do anything to get KaBlam! good ratings—including firing someone or getting Henry into many physical accidents. His granddaughter Dawn says he has never been the same since they canceled Charlie's Angels.
 Henry's mother shows her love for her son in an exaggerated way. In "Cramming Cartoons Since 1627", her name is revealed to be Lois.
 Mr. Jimmy McGee appeared twice as a co-host of June on KaBlam! He gets in fights with Henry's mom. Appears to be a parody of Ed McMahon. His catchphrase is "Ahooga!". Voiced by show writer Robert Mittenthal.

Sniz & Fondue 
 Began: Season 1 
Ended: Season 3

A pair of ferret roommates who often get on each other's nerves. Sniz is the younger kid ferret that is very hyperactive, and quite a troublemaker of the duo, while Fondue is the older teenage ferret, who is the nervous, yet intelligent one. There is also Snuppa and Bianca, Sniz and Fondue's roommates. From mid-1997 (around KaBlam's second season) until Sniz and Fondue ended production in late 1998 (around KaBlam!s third or fourth season).  Due to its production company going to work on a television adaptation of Watership Down as well as creator Michael Pearlstein leaving the show out of frustration, Sniz & Fondue was taken off of the KaBlam! roster after season 3, although it still appeared in the intro. The show was created by Michael Pearlstein. The pilot "Psyched for Snuppa" was produced in 1992 by Stretch Films and Jumbo Pictures, and was directed by John R. Dilworth, creator of Cartoon Network's Courage the Cowardly Dog. Unfortunately, John R. Dilworth, Jim Jinkins, and David Campbell were only involved in the pilot, but later all had no involvement with the rest of Sniz & Fondue when it became a part of KaBlam!. Reasons were that Doug creator Jim Jinkins and David Campbell have officially moved their jobs to Disney when they purchased Jumbo Pictures, and John R. Dilworth would later work on other projects, such as creating Courage the Cowardly Dog for Cartoon Network in 1999.

Action League Now!
 Began: Season 1 
Ended: Season 4

Filmed in "Chuckimation", in which the characters/props are moved by unseen hands or thrown from off-camera (interspersed with occasional stop motion animation). Action League Now! featured a group of superheroes, played by custom-made action figures, who fight crime in  suburbia despite being total idiots. The four superheroes are The Flesh, Thundergirl, Stinky Diver, and Meltman. Considered to be the most successful KaBlam! short, it briefly became a spin-off series in 2001. Action League Now! is the only short to have a new episode with every showing of KaBlam! and it served as the centerpiece of KaBlam!. All of the characters on the shorts were voiced by personalities from radio station WDVE in Pittsburgh. The show was created by Robert Mittenthal, Will McRobb, and Albie Hecht

Life with Loopy 
Began: Season 1

Ended: Season 4

The life of a preteen boy Larry and his strange experiences with his imaginative and adventurous younger sister Loopy. The characters were animated with stop-motion puppet bodies, but their heads were created with metal and their features were magnetic. The show was created by a British-born Stephen Holman, who previously created Joe Normal for MTV's Liquid Television, and later created Phantom Investigators on Kids' WB.

Characters 
 Lupicia "Loopy" Cooper is an imaginative young girl with a knack for discovering surreal things, such as a world under the sofa. While she is often discouraged by Larry whenever she goes out to adventure, she does never let that stop her. Loopy is voiced by Danielle Judovits.
 Larry Cooper is Loopy's intelligent brother. Much like Lassie, Larry knows every detail of Loopy's adventures and narrates all of them, although he is not almost there.
 Mrs. Cooper is Loopy and Larry's mother. She is more intelligent, but one episode reveals that she was a secret agent.
 Mr. Cooper is Loopy and Larry's father. He is more of the "laid-back" kind of guy, but one episode reveals he loses his temper when he receives bills.

Prometheus and Bob 
Began: Season 1

Ended: Season 4

Also known as The Prometheus and Bob Tapes. A stop motion segment featuring the camera-recorded mission logs of Prometheus, an alien who comes to Earth attempting to teach a caveman, Bob, everyday things. From the use of fire to the act of ice skating, the result is usually a failure by the mischievous third cast member, who was a simple monkey. The show was created by Cote Zellers.

The introduction, done in a mock government format, describes the events as having occurred "900,000 years ago".

Characters 
 Prometheus is a gaunt purple alien of advanced intelligence who speaks with a hollow sounding voice. He attempts to educate Bob, a caveman, as an experiment recorded on his remote-controlled camera. Prometheus is often injured in slapstick ways due to Bob's low intelligence.
 Bob is a babbling caveman. He once was completely covered in hair, but now has none because of a laser incident in the first clip. He also has a tendency to panic when frightened.
 The Monkey is a mischievous monkey who usually interferes with Prometheus' attempts to educate Bob, intentionally or otherwise. However, he has, on occasion, attempted to assist him.
 The Narrator recites the opening to the short, and the introduction to the short's "tape": "Tape [insert number here]", and finally, "End".

The Off-Beats 
 Began: Season 1

Ended: Season 2

A series that centers on a group of unpopular friends and their main rivals, a popular clique known as "The Populars". It originally aired during Nick's commercial breaks as stand-alone shorts to promote the premiere of KaBlam!, and it was also released on a 1996 Rugrats videotape, "Tommy Troubles". The show was created by Mo Willems, who later created Sheep in the Big City for Cartoon Network. The show was taken off the KaBlam! roster after season 2 because Mo Willems wanted to move over to Cartoon Network. However, The Off-Beats officially ended as a whole with a half-hour Valentine's Day special premiering in 1999, which was the last episode of the Off-Beats produced, as Mo Willems finally left Nickelodeon in 1999, and moved to Cartoon Network to create Sheep in the Big City in 2000.

Other shorts 
 Surprising Shorts – The only short segment not to have recurring characters, these shorts usually had nothing to do with any previous shorts included on the show. This segment was exclusive to season 1, and was usually introduced by June pulling down Henry's pants, revealing his unflattering and garishly colored boxer shorts, hence the name.
 Lava! – Originally titled in France as Guano!, these shorts typically featured animals partaking in cartoonish situations. These were edited out of international airings and future reruns for copyright issues by Vivendi, as they own Canal+, which co-produced the shorts, although the credits for the short may still be intact. Some of the original Guano! shorts contained more inappropriate elements than what was featured on the show. This segment appeared 4 times throughout season 1, and once in season 2, without the Surprising Shorts introduction.
 Anemia and Iodine – One-time short. A cartoon displaying the misadventures of a Goth girl cat and her skateboarding, hyperactive best friend. It was created by alternative comics artist Krystine Kryttre and was directed by Robert Scull, most noted for his earlier work on Rocko's Modern Life, and shares visual similarities to that show as a result.
 Angela Anaconda – A cutout-photo short that was later spun off into a stand-alone Canadian-animated series on the Fox Family Channel and was briefly rerun on Nickelodeon as well as Starz Kids and Family in the United States. This series is about a girl named Angela, who is a social outcast. She finds herself unpopular in school and always seems to be in the wrong place at the wrong time. Nanette, a faux-French girl who everyone loves and wants to be, always mocks Angela. During each episode, a poem-like story is narrated by Angela. She often gets her revenge on the antagonist of that particular episode, and more often imagines her revenge on the said antagonist in a highly exaggerated manner. Due to copyrights being held with Fox, the repeated KaBlam! shorts were banned airing on Nicktoons. Some people believe this is the reason why any season/series DVD can't become a reality. It appeared twice in season 1, with only the first appearance being introduced as a Surprising Short.
 JetCat – A segment about a girl who has an identity as a cat superhero and flies around and saves her city. She says she "flies like a jet and fights like a cat." This is the only short that takes place outside of the comic book. It was featured as a comic in Nickelodeon Magazine for a short time. The music was composed by Rocko's Modern Life composer Pat Irwin. Created by Jay Stephens of Tutenstein fame.
 Race Rabbit – A live-action show about a romantic rabbit racer with a British accent who competes in races but there is really trouble along the way caused by the Boolies (Zit and Winston), who are his human enemies. Race Rabbit always wins the race, foiling the Boolies' plans along the way. The only KaBlam! short created in the United Kingdom. Created by Scott Fellows, who is also the creator of Johnny Test.
 The Adventures of PatchHead – A live-action/computer-animated segment about a barefoot kid with a watermelon for a hat and has a Southern Accent, stopping cheaters from winning competitions. This short is notable for featuring an early appearance by Nick Offerman.
 The Brothers Tiki – A puppetry/stop-motion/live-action segment about two extraterrestrials resembling mini tiki statues (equivalent to lawn gnomes), who land on Earth in a ship bearing a striking resemblance to a barbecue grill.
 Fuzzball – A non-recurring cartoon about a tomboy who tries to win back her father's trophy, which she broke. Created by Kevin Dougherty.
 The Louie and Louie Show – A short that appears only once on the show. Two neglected pets (a hamster and a chameleon), both named Louie, try to get some attention from their owners, who are all too busy playing with the family dog. This short was animated by Gary Baseman and directed by Tom McGrath. An early version, produced by Curious Pictures, also aired on Nickelodeon once by itself before KaBlam! premiered. The only KaBlam! short to have a "Nickelodeon presents" logo at the beginning. Louie the chameleon is voiced by James Belushi, and Louie the hamster is voiced by Billy West.
 Little Freaks – Another one-time cartoon. Three freaky superheroes try to stop a villain from controlling the world's fashion trends. When it aired on Nicktoons by itself, the "KaBlam! Presents" at the beginning was absent.
 The Shizzagee – One-off short about the only existing creature of its kind who resembles a coyote and lives with his owner named Brutus. It is the only computer-animated short to air on KaBlam!.
 The Girl With Her Head Coming Off – one time short created by Emily Hubley.
 Randall Flan's Incredible Big Top – one time short about a traveling circus ringmaster who must prevent his blue lion from performing in a town who hates blue lions.
 Untalkative Bunny – a one-time short that finally got a series in the early 2000s that, like Angela Anaconda, was produced by Canada's Teletoon. This short had previously aired on an episode of Cartoon Sushi.
 Garbage Boy – one-off short animated in a collage-based art style about a kid who can make items out of garbage.
 Emmett Freedy – one-off short animated in stop-motion where a kid gets a piece of cereal stuck in his hair that is mistaken for lice.
 Stewy the Dog Boy – one-off short about a dog who acts like a boy, similar to Disney's Teacher's Pet.
 Dave, Son of Hercules – a one-off short about a preteen boy who is the son of the Roman god Hercules and is embarrassed by him. This was animated by the same people who did the Henry & June segments.

There were also various They Might Be Giants music videos for the songs "Why Does the Sun Shine?" and "Doctor Worm". In addition, there was a music video of "Hockey Monkey", created by James Kochalka and performed by The Zambonis. These were a mixture of live-action by Jesse Gordon and different animation styles, all produced and directed at The Ink Tank.

Cancelled spin-off film 
A live-action Prometheus and Bob film was announced in 1998 to be directed by Harald Zwart, produced by Amy Heckerling and Twink Caplan and written by Joe Stillman, but was scrapped due to a lack of interest. According to Cote Zellers, Chris Farley and David Spade were both considered until the former's death, and much of the script was reused for Gulliver's Travels.

The Henry & June Show
A television special called The Henry & June Show was produced and aired on Nickelodeon in 1999. The first segment, "A Show of Their Own" aired, featured Henry and June with a studio audience and musical guests. The next segment was "Be True to Your School", where Henry and June attend school, and try their best to tackle hard subjects like "How to Look Your Best". It was never shown again after it premiered.

Blocks
A number of blocks were hosted by Henry and June for various Nicktoons including:
 Henry and June's Nicktoon Summer Jam – Aired in mid-1999.
 101% Whizbang! With Henry and June (AKA 101% Spooky Whizbang for Halloween 1999) – A block showing Nicktoons of a certain theme from September to October 1999.
 Nicktoon World News with Henry and June – Aired in mid-2001 during SpongeBob's Nicktoon Summer Splash

During the promos, Henry's hair looked slightly different in some shots, along with it being a different shade of green. June's cardigan was cherry-red instead of light red/dark orange, and the dots weren't visible. Also, their eyes were blue and green in every shot, instead of being black or blue (or green) and black.

Broadcast
KaBlam! first premiered on October 11, 1996 and ran for four seasons, totaling 48 episodes. The final episode was broadcast on May 27, 2000. Reruns continued to air on Nickelodeon until 2001.

In 2002, Nicktoons was launched, and the channel began airing reruns of the program, though not all episodes were aired. During commercial breaks, various shorts from the show would play, not including any shorts involving Henry and June or music videos. In September 2005, Nicktoons revamped its branding and schedule, and removed several older series in the process, including KaBlam!. The "KaBlam! Presents:" shorts would continue to air until 2008 when the channel removed all of their intersitial programming for more commercial space. The program would only be seen one more time in December 2007 for Nicktoons Network's "100 Greatest Nicktoon Episodes" marathon, although it was not shown when Nick had a marathon of the first episodes of each Nicktoon on Thanksgiving Day 2007, despite having Henry and June on the cover of the now-defunct Nickelodeon Magazine.

KaBlam! was not seen on American television again until October 8–9, 2016, when Nickelodeon's 1990s-oriented block on TeenNick spotlighted the show and other classic Nicktoons for the brand's 25th anniversary.

Internationally, a French-language dub has been broadcast in France on television channel Game One (see Télévision Par Satellite), and other dubs of the show are on other Nickelodeon channels around Europe. It also was shown in the United Kingdom from 1997 to 2000. In Poland, it aired from 1999 to 2001 on Fantastic. The show was aired in Estonia as well. The show is aired on YTV in Canada.

Home media and streaming
The show has only one episode "Won’t Crack or Peel" (3D broadcast version) that was ever released on VHS, as part of a promotion with Tombstone Pizza. There are no other home video releases. Nickelodeon insiders have stated that this is due to licensing issues regarding individual segments. Additionally, the show would not be included on a streaming service until VRV added KaBlam! on August 28, 2018. As of June 2021, select episodes of KaBlam! have been made available to stream on Paramount+. and on Amazon Prime Video through a Paramount+ subscription.

See also 

 Action League Now!
 All That
 Angela Anaconda
 Cartoon Planet
 Cartoon Sushi
 JetCat
 Liquid Television
 The Off-Beats
 Oh Yeah! Cartoons
 Random! Cartoons
 Raw Toonage
 Robot Chicken
 Sniz & Fondue
 TripTank
 What a Cartoon!

References

External links 
 
 Complete series on Mark Marek's website

 
1990s American animated television series
1990s American anthology television series
1990s American children's comedy television series
1990s American satirical television series
1990s American sketch comedy television series
1990s American variety television series
2000s American animated television series
2000s American anthology television series
2000s American children's comedy television series
2000s American satirical television series
2000s American sketch comedy television series
2000s American variety television series
1996 American television series debuts
American animated television spin-offs
2000 American television series endings
1990s Nickelodeon original programming
2000s Nickelodeon original programming
American stop-motion animated television series
American children's animated anthology television series
American children's animated comedy television series
American children's animated fantasy television series
All That
Children's sketch comedy
English-language television shows
Nicktoons
YTV (Canadian TV channel) original programming
American television series with live action and animation
American television shows featuring puppetry
Television series created by Robert Mittenthal
Television series created by Will McRobb and Chris Viscardi
Television shows about comics